= Willy Verginer =

Italian artist (born 1957)

- Born: February 23, 1957 (age 69); Bressanone, South Tyrol, Italy
- Known for: Sculpture

Willy Verginer (born February 23, 1957, in Bressanone, South Tyrol) is an Italian contemporary sculptor who lives and works in Ortisei, Italy. He attended the Art Institute of Ortisei, where he studied Painting.
